Wola Krecowska  (Volia Kretsivs’ka) is a village in the administrative district of Gmina Tyrawa Wołoska, within Sanok County, Podkarpackie Voivodeship, in south-eastern Poland.

References

Wola Krecowska